Debbie Hayton (born 1968) is a transgender British secondary school science teacher and political activist.

Activism 
Since 2016, she has been a vocal opponent of gender self-identification, and supports laws which aim to define women-only spaces as being based on sex rather than gender identity. She has spoken at meetings for Woman's Place UK, a "gender-critical" group.

At a July 2019 event hosted by Fair Play For Women, Hayton wore a T-shirt which (mimicking a slogan by Stonewall) stated that "Trans women are men. Get over it." She was criticised and threatened with expulsion from the LGBT+ committee of the Trades Union Congress for her actions. Hayton had sat on the committee for five years.

In 2020, the National Education Union's Trans and non-binary network criticised Hayton's appointment by the union for a role on the TUC's LGBT+ Committee.

Hayton's inclusion in Church of England resource materials caused controversy at General Synod in 2021. Jayne Ozanne criticised the inclusion, describing Hayton as someone "outspoken in her denial of the very existence of trans people". Synod member Ian Paul supported Hayton, asking Bishop Sarah Mullally about actions being taken to protect Hayton "from intimidation and from attempts to silence her".

Personal life 
Hayton is a transgender woman, who underwent gender transition in 2012 and gender reassignment surgery in 2016. She is married with three children.

References

External links 

 

English journalists
Living people
British LGBT journalists
Transgender writers
Transgender women
21st-century LGBT people
1968 births